Sir Henry Francis Howard  (3 November 1809 – 28 January 1898) was a British diplomat who was envoy to several countries.

Career
Howard entered the Diplomatic Service in 1828. He was Secretary of the British legation at The Hague 1845–1846 and at Berlin 1846–1853; Minister to Brazil 1853–1855; Minister to Portugal 1855–1859; Minister to Hanover 1859–1866; and finally was the last British Minister to the Kingdom of Bavaria 1866–1872 (the post was downgraded to chargé d'affaires after Bavaria joined the German Empire).

Howard was appointed CB on 10 February 1863 and knighted KCB only three weeks later. He was promoted to GCB after his retirement in 1872.

Family
Henry Francis Howard was a descendant of Lord William Howard, younger son of Thomas Howard, 4th Duke of Norfolk. In 1830 he married the Hon. Sevilla Erskine, daughter of David Erskine, 2nd Baron Erskine: they had one daughter before she died in 1835. In 1841 he married Marie Ernestine von der Schulenburg: their elder son Henry Howard also became a diplomat, minister and, with his knighthood, also Sir Henry Howard; their younger son Francis Howard became a general in the British army. Lady Howard (as she had become) died in 1897.

References
HOWARD, Sir Henry Francis, Who Was Who, A & C Black, 1920–2008; online edn, Oxford University Press, Dec 2007, retrieved 4 June 2012
Obituary: Sir H.F. Howard, The Times, 29 January 1898, page 12

External links

1809 births
1898 deaths
Henry Francis Howard
Ambassadors of the United Kingdom to Brazil
Ambassadors of the United Kingdom to Portugal
Ambassadors to Bavaria
Knights Grand Cross of the Order of the Bath
19th-century British diplomats